The 2017 Mekong Club Championship was the 4th season of the Mekong Club Championship. The championship was sponsored by Toyota and was played between December 2017 and January 2018 featuring teams from Cambodia, Laos, Thailand and Vietnam. This edition, the champions of 2017 Myanmar National League was absent from the tournament.

Qualified teams

Venues

First round
 Times listed are local (UTC+7:00)

First Leg

Second Leg

Sanna Khánh Hòa won 9–5 on aggregate.

Knockout stage

Bracket

 Times listed are local (UTC+7:00)

Semi-final

Final

First Leg

Second Leg

Winner

Goalscorers

References

External links
 Official site

2017
2017 in Vietnamese football
2017 in Laotian football
2017 in Cambodian football
2017 in Thai football